The  is an archaeological site in the Sugusaka neighborhood of the city of Toyama in the Hokuriku region of Japan containing the ruins of a settlement from the Japanese Paleolithic period to the Jōmon period. It has been protected as a National Historic Site since 1981.

Outline
The Sugusaka site is located on a fluvial terrace on the right bank of the Jinzū River in what is now part of the Sarukurayama ski resort on the outskirts of the city of Toyama. This is the border between the mountainous interior of Toyama and the coastal plains. In this vicinity there are a number of archaeological sites from the Japanese Palaeolithic to the Jōmon era, including the Nozawa site, Yagiyama Ono site, Naosaka II site, Naosaka III site, Naosaka IV site, indicating that this area has been densely populated since the earliest times. The Sugusaka site was discovered in 1971 during construction work for the establishment of a ranch, when a stone hearth dating from the middle of the Jōmon period was discovered. In response, in 1972 the Toyama Board of Education conducted excavation surveys of the area.  

From the Japanese Paleolithic period, some 1200 stone blades were found. These blades were dated to about 25,000 to 30,000 years ago, and are thus the oldest thus found in the Hokuriku region. Apart from this, local polished stone axes, projectile points, and carving tools have been excavated. The site also contained thousands of fist-sized stones which had burn marks. These stones appear to have used for cooking purposes by heating in a fire and dropping into a container.

Early examples of embossed Jōmon pottery mainly composed of elliptical patterns were also found, including pottery with patterns created by a rolling die, and embossed pottery. These pottery shards were from the Hida, Shinano, Kinki and Tōkai regions indicating long range trade routes from a very early period in Japanese history. By the middle Jōmon period, the settlement had extended along the valley extending to the north and south, with numerous pit dwellings surrounding a central plaza. 

The site, which was backfilled after excavation and is now an empty lot, is about a ten-minute walk from Sasazu Station on the JR West Takayama Main Line.

See also

List of Historic Sites of Japan (Toyama)

References

External links
Toyama City official site 
Toyama Prefecture official site 

History of Toyama Prefecture
Toyama (city)
Historic Sites of Japan
Paleolithic sites in Japan